Shree Hareshwar Vidyalaya, is a higher secondary School in Karjule Hareshwar, Ahmednagar, Maharashtra, India. It was founded in 1978 and is a part of the Shree Hareshwar Education Society's group of educational schools.

Education
The school provides education from 5th standard to 10th standard.

Courses
The school offers education in two mediums

Marathi Medium
 Marathi (1st Language)
 Hindi (2nd Language)
 English (3rd Language)
 Mathematics (in Marathi)
 Science (in Marathi)
 Social sciences (in Marathi)
Mathematics, Science and Social sciences are taught in Marathi.

Semi-English Medium
 Marathi (1st Language)
 Hindi (2nd Language)
 English (3rd Language)
 Mathematics (in English)
 Science (in English)
 Social sciences (in Marathi)
Mathematics and Science are taught in English.

See also 
 Karjule Hareshwar
 Shri Dhokeshwar Mahavidyalaya

References 

Schools in Maharashtra
Education in Ahmednagar district
Educational institutions established in 1978
1978 establishments in Maharashtra